Bhima Nayak or Bheema Nayak (death 29 December 1876) was an Indian revolutionary. He fought against the British in the Indian Rebellion of 1857. When Bhima was convicted by the British government, he was kept in Port Blair and Nicobar.

Revolt & Death 
Nayak hails from Barwani district of Madhya Pradesh. As a Bhil tribal leader he took active part in the Indian Rebellion of 1857 against the East India Company. Nayak met Tantia Tope at the time of revolt. He confronted the force of Captain Keatings, but successfully escaped. In 1861 he was captured from his hideout and sent to Andaman Islands for corporal punishment. He was hanged in Port Blair on December 29, 1876. Bhima was also known as Nimad's Robin Hood.

Legacy 
A government scheme, "Shaheed Bhima Nayak Pariyojna" in Madhya Pradesh is named after him. CM Shivraj Singh Chauhan dedicated a "Bhima Nayak Memorial" at village Dhaba Bawdi of Badwani district on January 21, 2017.

Further reading

Bhima Naik name background 
 Revolutionary movement for Indian independence

References 

Adivasi people
1876 deaths
Revolutionary movement for Indian independence
Executed revolutionaries
Indian revolutionaries
19th-century executions by British India
Executed Indian people
People executed by British India by hanging
People from Barwani district